Eastern Yugur is the Mongolic language spoken within the Yugur nationality. The other language spoken within the same community is Western Yughur, which is a Turkic language. The terms may also indicate the speakers of these languages, which are both unwritten. Traditionally, both languages are indicated by the term Yellow Uygur, from the autonym of the Yugur. Eastern Yugur speakers are said to have passive bilingualism with Inner Mongolian, the standard spoken in China.

Eastern Yugur is a threatened language with an aging population of fluent speakers. Language contact with neighbouring languages, particularly Chinese, has noticeably affected the language competency of younger speakers. Some younger speakers have also begun to lose their ability to distinguish between different phonetic shades within the language, indicating declining language competency.

Grigory Potanin recorded a glossary of Salar, Western Yugur, and Eastern Yugur in his 1893 book written in Russian, The Tangut-Tibetan Borderlands of China and Central Mongolia.

Phonology 

The phonemes /ç, çʰ, ɕ, ɕʰ, ʂ, ʑ/ appear exclusively in Chinese loanwords.

Vowel length is also distributed.

References

Further reading

 
 
 

Agglutinative languages
Southern Mongolic languages
Languages of China
Mongolic languages